Stéphane Ziani (born 9 December 1971) is a French former professional footballer, who played as a defensive midfielder with scoring ability. Following his career as a player, he managed FC Libourne-Saint-Seurin (2008) and Fujairah SC (2016).

Club career
A product of FC Nantes's renowned youth system, Ziani was a key member for hometown squad from an early age, having represented the side on two separate stints: from 1991 to 94 and from 2000 to 2004.

As a holding midfielder, he scored 11 league goals for RC Lens in 1997–98 for his first national championship, also achieved in 2001 with Nantes (the latter of which he contributed 31 appearances). With Nantes he also won the 2001 Trophée des Champions.

Ziani retired in 2006, having also represented SC Bastia, Stade Rennais F.C., FC Girondins de Bordeaux, Deportivo de La Coruña, Servette FC and AC Ajaccio.

Managerial career
On 11 December 2008, he was sacked as manager by FC Libourne-Saint-Seurin.

Personal
Ziani's father is of Algerian origin, hailing from the Kabyle city of Bejaia.

References

External links
 
 

Living people
1971 births
Kabyle people
French people of Kabyle descent
Association football midfielders
French footballers
FC Nantes players
SC Bastia players
Stade Rennais F.C. players
FC Girondins de Bordeaux players
RC Lens players
Deportivo de La Coruña players
La Liga players
Servette FC players
Swiss Super League players
AC Ajaccio players
Ligue 1 players
French football managers
Footballers from Nantes
French expatriate footballers
Expatriate footballers in Spain
French expatriate sportspeople in Switzerland
French expatriate sportspeople in Spain
Expatriate footballers in Switzerland